A probate court (sometimes called a surrogate court) is a court that has competence in a jurisdiction to deal with matters of probate and the administration of estates. In some jurisdictions, such courts may be referred to as Orphans' Courts or courts of ordinary. In some jurisdictions probate court functions are performed by a chancery court or another court of equity, or as a part or division of another court.

Probate courts administer proper distribution of the assets of a decedent (one who has died), adjudicates the validity of wills, enforces the provisions of a valid will (by issuing the grant of probate), prevents malfeasance by executors and administrators of estates, and provides for the equitable distribution of the assets of persons who die intestate (without a valid will), such as by granting a grant of administration giving judicial approval to the personal representative to administer matters of the estate.

In contested matters, the probate court examines the authenticity of a will and decides who is to receive the deceased person's property. In a case of an intestacy, the court determines who is to receive the deceased's property under the law of its jurisdiction. The probate court will then oversee the process of distributing the deceased's assets to the proper beneficiaries. A probate court can be petitioned by interested parties in an estate, such as when a beneficiary feels that an estate is being mishandled. The court has the authority to compel an executor to give an account of their actions.

In some jurisdictions (e.g. Texas) probate courts also handle other matters, such as guardianships, trusts, and mental health issues (including the authority to order involuntary commitment to psychiatric facilities and involuntary administering psychiatric medication).

Orphans' Court 
An Orphans' Court was an organization established in the Chesapeake Bay American colonies during colonization. The major goal of the organization was to protect orphaned children and their right to their deceased family member's estate from claims and against abuses by stepparents and others.

Today, at least in Maryland and in Pennsylvania, probate courts are still called Orphans' Courts, for historical reasons, hearing matters involving wills of deceased estates which are contested and supervising estates which are probated judicially.

Register of Probate 
A Register of Probate is an elected position in some jurisdictions in the United States, such as New Hampshire, Massachusetts, and Maine (part of Massachusetts before 1820).  Register of Wills is an elected position in jurisdictions such as Maryland.

The Registrar and staff administer the local Probate Court, typically for a given county, acting partly as public customer service and partly as clerks for the probate judge (who may or may not be elected).

List of probate courts
The following is a partial list of probate courts:

England and Wales
 Prerogative court—former 
 Court of Probate—former
 High Court of Justice Family Division—current

State courts of the United States
 California Superior Court
 Connecticut—Connecticut Probate Courts (a system of 54 probate court districts)
 Delaware—Office of Register of Wills
 District of Columbia—Superior Court of the District of Columbia, Probate Division
Florida Florida Circuit Court, County Comptroller's Office
 Georgia—Probate Court formerly known as the Court of Ordinary (judge formally known as ordinary) 
 Maryland—County Orphans' Courts, Office of Register of Wills
 Massachusetts—Probate and Family Court, Register of Probate
 Michigan—County Probate Courts
 Missouri—conducted by Circuit Courts, some of which have separate probate divisions, Office of Public Administrator
 New Hampshire—New Hampshire Probate Court
 New Jersey—New Jersey Superior Court, Chancery Division, Probate Part, Surrogate's Court (judges known as surrogates), Surrogate's Office
 New York—New York Surrogate's Court (judges known as surrogates)
 Ohio—conducted by Courts of Common Pleas, Family and Probate Divisions, Probate Court 
 Pennsylvania—Orphans' Court Division of the Court of Common Pleas, Office of Register of Wills 
 Texas—see Judiciary of Texas; the county court handles probate matters in most instances, but its jurisdiction may overlap with the district court. Also, in ten specific counties the Texas Legislature has established one or more Probate Courts to handle probate matters, removing them from county or district court jurisdiction.
 Vermont—Probate Courts, one in each of Vermont's 14 counties
 Virginia—Virginia Circuit Court

Canada
 New Brunswick—Probate Court of New Brunswick
 Nova Scotia—Probate Court of Nova Scotia
 All other provinces are constitutionally required to process probate through their superior courts as per section 96 of the Constitution, 1867.

References

Wills and trusts
Inheritance
Probate courts